Lakshminarayana Subramaniam (born 23 July 1947) is an Indian violinist, composer and conductor, trained in the classical Carnatic music tradition and Western classical music.

Early years
Subramaniam was born in Madras, Madras Presidency, British India, to V. Lakshminarayana Iyer and Seethalakshmi, both accomplished musicians.

He lived in Jaffna during his younger years, taking up music studies before the age of five. He began training in violin under the tutelage of his father, Professor V. Lakshminarayana. "Mani", as he is fondly known by fellow musicians and his family, gave his first public performance at the age of six.

His uncles include Ramnad Raghavan and Ramnad Krishnan. His brothers are also acclaimed musicians, and include the violinist-composers L. Shankar (alias. Shenkar), and the late L. Vaidyanathan. He has released recordings with both.

Subramaniam developed a passion for music as well as science from a young age, studying Medicine and acquiring his M.B.B.S. at Madras Medical College. He registered as a General Practitioner, before deciding to pursue music full-time. He has a master's degree in Western classical music, which he acquired at the California Institute of the Arts.

Performing career
Since 1973, Subramaniam has amassed over 200 recordings to his credit, releasing several solo albums, recording collaborations with musicians Yehudi Menuhin, Stéphane Grappelli, Ruggiero Ricci and Jean-Pierre Rampal, further to making albums and performing with Ruggiero Ricci, Herbie Hancock, Joe Sample, Jean-Luc Ponty, Stanley Clarke John Handy, George Harrison and several others.

He has accompanied highly regarded vocalists in Carnatic music on stage including Chembai Vaidyanatha Bhagavatar, K. V. Narayanaswamy, Semmangudi Srinivasa Iyer, M. Balamuralikrishna, M. D. Ramanathan, and Alathur Srinivasa Iyer. He has also performed many concerts with the venerable Palghat Mani Iyer on the Mridangam, in addition to collaborating with musicians of North Indian Hindustani music and artists of other music systems.

Subramaniam has written works for orchestras, ballets and Hollywood film scores, and written books on music – such as Euphony – in addition to composing symphonies and Carnatic pieces.

In 1983, he composed a Double Concerto for violin and flute which combined western scales with micro intervals. Another release, Spring – Rhapsody, was a homage to Bach and Baroque music. Creations with orchestras that have followed include Fantasy on Vedic Chants with the Mariinsky Theatre Orchestra, conducted by Djemal Dalgat, Turbulence with The Swiss Romande Orchestra, "The Concert of Two Violins" with the Oslo Philharmonic, and Global Symphony with the Berlin State Opera (broadcast live to 28 nations) among others. He has also performed a concert tour of China, with the Beijing Symphony Orchestra in Beijing.

His compositions have been used in stage presentations of leading dance companies such as the San Jose Ballet company and the Alvin Ailey American Dance Theater. Subramaniam composed the piece "Shanti Priya" for the Mariinsky Ballet.

The release of his albums, including Global Fusion in 1999 have brought Subramaniam widespread critical acclaim, and popularity for his advanced playing. He founded and directs the Lakshminarayana Global Music Festival, a festival based in India. In 2004, he completed a world tour with the festival, including concerts in the US (Lincoln Center, New York), the Asian Pacific region including in Perth, Australia, at the Esplanade, Singapore, the Sri Dewan Penang Hall in Penang and the Putra World Trade Centre in Kuala Lumpur, Malaysia. Performing with Subramaniam at the festival in January 2005 were violin maestro Arve Tellefsen, the Oslo Camerata, jazz legends Stanley Clarke, George Duke, Al Jarreau, Earl Klugh and Ravi Coltrane.

In September 2007, Subramaniam premiered and played "The Freedom Symphony" with the Fairfax Symphony Orchestra, Warrenton Chorale and Carnatic percussionists, which led to a strongly favourable ovation and an encore piece "Flight of the Humble Bee". Subramaniam is on the advisory board of composer A. R. Rahman's KM Music Conservatory in Kodambakkam, Chennai.

In 2011, he was invited to perform at the United Nations. On 24 October 2012, he performed as a Special Guest Artist with Stevie Wonder at the latter's message of peace concert at the UN. Yehudi Menuhin said of Subramaniam:

When asked about his musical accomplishments, Subramaniam has always said,

Film career
He composed the film scores for the films Salaam Bombay (1988) and Mississippi Masala (1991) directed by Mira Nair, in addition to being the featured violin soloist in Bernardo Bertolucci's Little Buddha (1993) and Cotton Mary (1999) of Merchant-Ivory productions.

Lakshminarayana Global Music Festival

He started the Lakshminarayana Global Music Festival in 1992, to honour the memory of his father Professor V. Lakshminarayana, who died in 1990. Artists have included the Subramaniam family, Al Jarreau, George Duke, Solo Cissokho, Miya Masaoka, Mark O'Connor, Loyko, Jean-Luc Ponty, Ustad Bismillah Khan, Larry Coryell, Arve Tellefsen, Pandit Jasraj, Dr. M. Balamuralikrishna and Corky Siegel.

The festival has centred around special concepts such as Violins for Peace, Visions of India and Sounds of India.

Subramaniam Academy of Performing Arts
In 2007, the Subramaniam Foundation, a charity run by Subramaniam and his wife set up a music school called the Subramaniam Academy of Performing Arts (SAPA), in Bangalore, India.

Personal life

Subramaniam was married to Viji Subramaniam (née Vijayashree Shankar), who died on 9 February 1995 and since November 1999 has been married to the Indian playback singer Kavita Krishnamurthy. He has four children with Viji — Gingger Shankar, Bindu Subramaniam, Dr. Narayana Subramaniam and Ambi Subramaniam.

He continues to perform pieces with his daughter singer/songwriter Bindu Subramaniam, violin duets with his son, Ambi Subramaniam,” and has further recorded and given several concerts with Krishnamurthy.  Their collaborations have earned them the nickname Subramaniam Gharana. He also performs with his eldest son Dr. Narayana Subramaniam.

Awards and recognition

 PhD in music (Thesis on Raga Harmony for Orchestral compositions), Jain University (2017)
 D.Litt. Honoris Causa of ITM University, Gwalior (M.P.) (2016)
Lifetime Achievement Award, Limca Book of Records (2012)
GiMA (Best Carnatic Instrumental Album – Innovations), Global Indian Music Academy (2012)
Uttam Vag Geykar Jialal Vasant Award, Ajivasan (2011)
Big Star IMA Award (Best Classical Instrumental Album – Violin Maestros), Indian Music Academy (2011)
GiMA (Best Carnatic Instrumental Album – Violin Maestros), Global Indian Music Academy (2010)
GiMA (Best Fusion Album – Live at Neues Gewandhaus, Leipzig), Global Indian Music Academy (2010)
Tantri Nada Mani, Kanchi Kamakoti Peetham, Kanchipuram (2009)
Asthana Vidwan, ISKCON, Bangalore (2009)
Viswa Kala Bharathi Bharat Kalachar, Chennai (2004)
Sangeetha Kalaratna, Bangalore Gayana Samaja (2004)
Sangeetha Kalaa Shiromani, Percussive Arts Centre, Bangalore (2004)
Honorary Doctorate, Bangalore University (2003)
Padma Bhushan, Government of India(2001)
Manaviyam (Millennium) Award, Government of Kerala (2001)
Lotus Festival Award, City of Los Angeles (1998)
Special Medal of Honour, HH King Birendra of Nepal (1997)
Best Composer Award/Commission, NRK P2, Norway (1996)
Sangeeta Ratna Mysore, T. Chowdaiah Memorial National Award (1996)
Awarder at the World Music Festival at Madison Square Gardens, Bharatiya Vidya Bhavan, New York (1995)
Nada Chakravarthy, Ganapathi Sachchidananda Swamiji, Trinidad (1993)
Onida Pinnacle Award (Best title track composer: Surabhi) (1993)
Creative Music Award, Sangeet Natak Akademi (1990)
Padma Shri, Government of India (1988)
Award for outstanding contribution to Indo-American goodwill, understanding and friendship, Indo-American Society (1988)
Sangeeta Sagaram, Cultural Centre of Performing Arts (1984)
Grammy Nomination (for the album Indian Classical Music) (1981)
Orpheus of the East Kala Samarpana, Alliance Francaise, Chennai (24 November 1972)
Violin Chakravarthy, Governor of Madras (6/11/1972)
Best Western Instrumentalist, IIT Madras (1972)
President's Award for Best Violinist, All India Radio (1963)

Compositions

Orchestral Compositions

 Astral Symphony
 Beyond
 Concerto for Two Violins
 Double Concerto
 Double Concerto for Violin, Flute, and Orchestra
 Fantasy on Vedic Chants
 Flight of the Humble Bee
 Freedom Symphony
 Global Symphony
 Naada Priya
 Shanti Priya
 Spring Rhapsody
 Turbulence
 Violin Concerto No 1 for Violin and Orchestra

Fusion Compositions

 5 3/4 (Fantasy Without Limits)
 Ab Hum (Eulogy)
 Alone by the Ganges (From the Ashes)
 Ambience (The Violin Legends)
 Apna Street (Eulogy)
 Baba Kisses Solasaal (Salaam Bombay!)
 Beyond Borders (Beyond Borders)
 Beyond the flames (From the Ashes)
 Blessings (Eulogy)
 Blossom (Blossom)
 Blue Lotus (Global Fusion)
 Breeze (Mani & Co.)
 Bujish Na Ke (Eulogy)
 Chaipau Alone (Salaam Bombay!)
 Chaipau Helps Chillum Across the Tracks (Salaam Bombay!)
 Chaipau Sets Fire to Solasaal's Bed (Salaam Bombay!)
 Chaipau's Theme (Salaam Bombay!)
 Chameleon (Spanish Wave)
 Chick Melody (Salaam Bombay!)
 Chillum's Theme (Salaam Bombay!)
 Comfortable (Comfortable)
 Confluence (Best of L Subramaniam)
 Conversations (Conversations)
 Dancing Beauty (Spanish Wave)
 Dancing Dolls (Blossom)
 Darling Why Don't You Come to Me 
 Don't Leave Me (Conversations)
 Driving to Sunday Lunch (Mississippi Masala)
 End Credit Music (Salaam Bombay!)
 End of the Tunnel (Beyond Borders)
 Entry of Solasaal (Salaam Bombay!)
 Escape From the Chiller Room (Salaam Bombay!)
 Escape From the Chiller Room [Film Version]  (Salaam Bombay!)
 Fantasy Without Limits (Fantasy Without Limits)
 Farewell to Manju (Salaam Bombay!)
 Feeling Lonely (Fantasy Without Limits)
 Flight of the Humble Bee (Indian Express)
 Four Feet Away 
 French Resolution (Conversations)
 Frenzy (Fantasy Without Limits)
 Funeral Procession (Salaam Bombay!)
 Ganga (Live in Moscow)
 Garland (Garland)
 Gipsy Trail (Global Fusion)
 Grasshopper (Indian Express)
 Guess What (Indian Express)
 Hare Krishna (Eulogy)
 Harmony Of The Hearts  (Global Fusion)
 I Can't Forget (Indian Express)
 Illusion (Conversations)
 Indian Express (Indian Express)
 Infinite Journey (Garland)
 Inner Peace (Blossom)
 Jai Hanuman! (Global Fusion)
 Jay's Theme (Mississippi Masala)
 Jay's Theme [Variation] (Mississippi Masala)
 Journey (In New York)
 Kali Dance (Rainbow)
 Kampala Uganda Meets Greenwood Mississippi (Mississippi Masala)
 Lap-nils' Polska (Garland)
 Leaving Home: Farewell to Uganda (Mississippi Masala)
 Let There Be 
 Let's Talk (Mani & Co.)
 Lost Love (Global Fusion)
 Love is stronger than death (From the Ashes)
 Love Theme (Mississippi Masala)
 Lullaby (Beyond Borders)
 Main Titles (Salaam Bombay!)
 Mani Talks (Fantasy Without Limits)
 Manju's Theme (Salaam Bombay!)
 Memories (Conversations)
 Memories of Jaffna (Mani & Co.)
 Mina Chases Demetrius (Mississippi Masala)
 Mina's Theme (Mississippi Masala)
 Miss Melody (Live in Moscow)
 Moonlight (In New York)
 Motherland (Mani & Co.)
 Musical Tribute (East Meets West)
 Necklace Road (Beyond Borders)
 Ninth House (Spanish Wave)
 Offering of Love (Garland)
 Paganini Caprice (Conversations)
 Prayer (Blossom)
 Rainbow Serenade (Rainbow)
 Reunion (Beyond Borders)
 Roots (Blossom)
 Satya Priya (Solos Duos Trio)
 Seventh Heaven (Spanish Wave)
 Shadow of Heaven 
 Shloka (Intro to Global Symphony) (Eulogy)
 Solasaal's Theme (Salaam Bombay!)
 Souls Of Dead Children Floating (Salaam Bombay!)
 Spanish Wave (Spanish Wave)
 Spiritual Dance (Standing Ovation)
 Street Children Sing a Ballad of Lost Promises (Salaam Bombay!)
 Super Instinct (Mani & Co.)
 Surrender (Surrender)
 That Dream (Garland)
 The End of the Tunnel (Live in Moscow)
 The Pink Moment (Indian Express)
 The way you placed my bow (From the Ashes)
 Time Is Right (Blossom)
 Times Must Change (Live in Moscow)
 Towards the Island (Garland)
 Traditional Ugandan Bar Song (Mississippi Masala)
 Transformation 
 Tribute to Bach (In New York)
 Tribute to Mani (Conversations)
 Vision in White (Mani & Co.)
 Voices in Heaven (Mani & Co.)
 Walking in a Dream (Conversations)
 Watch Your Step (Live in Moscow)
 What's Happening? (Blossom)
 Whispering Moods (Indian Express)
 Winning the Hand 
 Winter In Austria (Spanish Wave)
 You And Me (Spanish Wave)

Carnatic Compositions

 Devapriya (Tranquility)
 Chandrapriya (Tranquility)
 Dasharagamalika Varnam
 Dawn (Expressions of Impressions)
 Devipriya Tillana
 Dwijavanti Tillana
 Ennai katharulvai (Mohana)
 Expressions of Impressions (Expressions of Impressions)
 Gananathane (Hamsadhwani)
 Ganapathi charanam (Vijayashree)
 Kuzhal oodum (Kaapi)
 Mahishasura mardini (Dharmavati)
 Panchanadai Tillana (Vasanta)
 Panchanadai Varnam (Kaanada)
 Parameshwari parvati devi (Pantuvarali)
 Ramapriya  (Tranquility)
 Sada manadil (Abhogi)
 Shantipriya (Tranquility)
 Two Minds (Expressions of Impressions)
 Vasantapriya (Tranquility)
 Wandering Saint (Expressions of Impressions)
 Weeping Soul (Expressions of Impressions)

Music for films
See Filmography

Discography (partial)

 Enchanting Melodies on the Violin (1977) (with Palghat Mani Iyer)
 Garland (1978) (Storyville) (featuring Svend Asmussen)
 Live in Concert (World Music Festival, 6 May 1978)
 Fantasy without Limits (Trend Records) (1979)
 Subramaniam (1980)
 Rainbow (1980) (with Ali Akbar Khan and John Handy)
 Indian Classical Music (1980) (featuring Zakir Hussain)
 Le violon de l'Inde du Sud (1980) (Ocora)
 Ragam, Tanam, Pallavi / The Virtuoso Violin of South India: Subramaniam (1981) (Plateselskapet MAI/Lyrichord)
 Blossom (1981) (Crusaders/MCA) (with Herbie Hancock and Larry Coryell)
 South Indian Strings (1981) (Lyrichord) (with Palghat Mani Iyer)
 Spanish Wave (1983) (Milestone)
 Indian Express (1984) (Milestone)
 The Irresistible Dr L. Subramanium (1985) (Oriental)
 Distant Visions (1985) (Audiorec)
 Magic Fingers (1986)
 Mani & Co. (1986) (featuring Maynard Ferguson) (Milestone)
 East Meets West (1987)
 Electric Modes: Winter Sessions (1988) (Water Lily Acoustics)
 An Anthology of South Indian Classical Music (1990) (Ocora)
 Indian Classical Masters: Raga Hemavati (1990) (Nimbus Records)
 Kalyani (1990) (Water Lily Acoustics)
 Expressions of Impressions (1991) (Sonic Atmospheres)
 Indian Classical Masters: Three Ragas for Solo Violin (1991) (Nimbus Records)
 Sarasvati (1991) (Water Lily Acoustics)
 Musical Heritage of South India (1992)
 Beyond (1993) (New Earth Records)
 Samarpanam (1993)
 Masters of Raga (1995) (Wergo)
 Pacific Rendezvous (1995) (Manu Music Productions)
 Electric Modes Volumes 1 & 2 (1995) (Water Lily Acoustics)
 Matchless (1999) (with Alla Rakha)
 Global Fusion (1999) (Warner/Erato Detour Records/Viji)
 Free your Mind (2002) (Iris Musique)Larry Coryell
 Asmita (2004) (Viji) (featuring Kavita Krishnamurthy and Bindu Subramaniam)
 Maestro's Choice (2004) (Music Today)
 My Golden Years (2004) (Music Today/Viji)
 Best of L. Subramaniam (2004) (Niranjani Music/BMI)
 The Violin Legends (2004) (with Yehudi Menuhin and Stéphane Grappelli)
 Violin Maestros (2007) (featuring Ambi Subramaniam)
 Innovations (2012) (featuring Palghat Mani Iyer) (EMI)

Collaborations with other artists
 L. Subramaniam with Stu Goldberg and Larry Coryell: Solos-Duos-Trios (1978) (MPS Records)
 L. Subramaniam with John Handy and Ali Akbar Khan: Rainbow (1980) (MPS)
 L. Subramaniam with Stéphane Grappelli: Conversations (1984) (Milestone)
 L. Subramaniam and Yehudi Menuhin: L. Subramaniam and Yehudi Menuhin in New York (1987)
 L. Subramaniam and Ali Akbar Khan: Duet (1993) (Delos)
 L. Subramaniam with Yehudi Menuhin and Stéphane Grappelli: All the World's Violins (1993)
 L. Subramaniam and Larry Coryell: From the Ashes (1999) (Water Lily Acoustics)
 L. Subramaniam with various artists: Lakshminarayana Global Music Festival: Vol. I & II (Sony Music)
 L. Subramaniam and Ustad Rais Khan: Sangeet Sangam (2005) (Navras Records)
 L. Subramaniam with Karsten Vogel: Meetings (2007) (Calibrated)

Live albums
 L. Subramaniam en concert: Southern Indian Violin (1983) (Harmonia Mundi/Ocora)
 India's Master Musicians (1983) (Delos/Ravi Shankar Music Circle)
 Live in Moscow / Time Must Be Changed (1988) (Melodiya/Boheme Music/BMG/Viji)
 In Praise of Ganesh (featuring Anindo Chatterjee) (1991) (Audiorec)
 L. Subramaniam en Concert (1995) (Ocora)
 Kingdom of Peace: Live in Nepal (1997)
 L. Subramaniam: Live in France
 L. Subramaniam and Bismillah Khan: Live in Geneva (1991)

Filmography

Composer
 Surabhi (1988) (composer, music arranger, musician: violinist)
 Salaam Bombay! (1988) (composer, music arranger, musician: violinist)
 Mississippi Masala (1991) (composer, musician: violin, violin synthesizers, percussions)
 Jayate (1997) (composer)
 Ee Snehatheerathu (2004) (composer)
 Banaz: A Love Story (2012) (composer, musician: violin)
 Gour Hari Dastaan (2013) (composer)
 Hey Ram (2000) (composer, left the project before completion)

Soloist
 Little Buddha (1993) (violinist)
 Kama Sutra: A Tale of Love (1996) (violinist)
 Cotton Mary (1999) (violinist)

Additional soundtracks
 Peace One Day (2004) (composer, performer: "Gypsy Trail")
 Baraka (1992) (performer: "Wandering Saint")
 Raga Mohanam (2012) (performer: "Samarpanam")

On Subramaniam
 L. Subramaniam: Violin From the Heart (1999).  Directed by Jean Henri Meunier.

References

External links
 
Official website: Dr. L. Subramaniam
Interview of Dr. L. Subramaniam 
Late Sri V.Lakshminarayana Iyer

1947 births
Carnatic violinists
Living people
Recipients of the Padma Bhushan in arts
Recipients of the Padma Shri in arts
Recipients of the Sangeet Natak Akademi Award
Tamil musicians
Milestone Records artists
Madras Medical College alumni
21st-century violinists